Margaret Harries Wilson (also known as Mrs. Cornwell Baron Wilson; 1796–1846) was an English poet, playwright, lyricist, writer and editor. She is considered one of the first female biographers.

Life
Margaret Harries was born in Shropshire in 1796. She created her first book of poetry in 1815, and after her second poetry collection was published, she married a solicitor in 1819. After this, she worked under her married name. Wilson was content to be "a domestic poet" as she considered that men could have larger ambitions. Wilson had a number of children, several of whom died, and this became a theme of several of her publications.

She wrote a poem in tribute to Anna Brownell Jameson who had the clever idea of writing a book about the fictional and actual loves of the famous poets of the time. The Loves of the Poets enabled readers to put themselves in the role of having a poet as an admirer.

Wilson wrote for journals including Forget Me Not, Friendship's Offering, The Keepsake and Pledge of Friendship. She wrote poems, prose and music and this was presented in her own 1833 publication, La Ninon, or, Leaves for the Album. Contributors to this included the notable writers Mary Howitt and Agnes Strickland. A publication that became New Monthly Belle Assemblée was also started in 1933 and this also included items on fashion. Wilson also wrote plays and one was retitled as Venus in Arms and it was performed at the Strand Theatre in 1836.

Her final achievement was as a biographer as she published three including The Life and Correspondence of M. G. Lewis. This was about her fellow writer and playwright which she published in two volumes anonymously in 1839. Wilson is considered one of the first female biographers. In her work Our Actresses, she acknowledges that these 67 women are admired, but they individually do not get a high position in society.

Wilson died in London on 12 January 1846.

Selected works
 Hours at Home: a Collection of Miscellaneous Poems, 1826
 The Cypress Wreath: a Collection of Original Ballads and Tales in Verse, 1828
 Poems, 1831
 Water Music, a Collection of National Melodies … Arranged with a Guitar Accompaniment, 1832
 The Life and Correspondence of M. G. Lewis, 1839
 A Volume of Lyrics, 1840
 Chronicles of Life, 1840
 Popularity: and the Destinies of Woman: Tales of the World, 1842
 Our Actresses; or Glances at Stage Favourites past and present, 1844

References

1797 births
1846 deaths
19th-century English writers
19th-century English poets
19th-century English dramatists and playwrights
19th-century biographers
19th-century English women writers
Writers from Shropshire
English women poets
British women dramatists and playwrights
English lyricists
English editors
English biographers
English women non-fiction writers
Women biographers